Penicillium indonesiae is a species of the genus of Penicillium.

References

indonesiae
Fungi described in 1980